The European Commission Data Protection Officer is a position in the European Commission responsible for independently ensuring the application, within the Commission, of Regulation 45/2001 regarding data protection. 

Further, the Officer maintains a register of all operations processing personal data, containing information on the purpose and conditions of operations, being available to the public (the register is available online).

See also
 European Data Protection Supervisor

References

External links
Data Protection Officer(DPO), European Commission
Network of DPOs, European Commission

Data Protection